Kok Ksor (Jarai: Ksor Kok, born 1945 in Gia Lai Province, in the Central Highlands of Vietnam, died in USA on 9 January 2019), was a member of the Jarai ethnic group and the President of the Montagnard Foundation, Inc., an organization, begun as an RSO at the University of Chicago, which states that its mission is to preserve the lives, rights and culture of the Montagnard people.

Kok Ksor was also a member of the Transnational Radical Party (TRP), a non-government agency that investigates human rights abuses in the world.

External links
Khmerkrom.com 
The Montagnard Foundation, Inc.
Relatives of Kok Ksor forced to confess 'wrongdoings' in Vietnam
Fostering a revolution?
Vietnam's Tribal Injustice
Transnational Radical Party

1945 births
2019 deaths
Vietnamese pacifists
Vietnamese exiles
Jarai people
People from Gia Lai Province